Alan Graham Arthur (12 November 1905 – 9 August 1979) was an Australian rules footballer who played thirty games for Essendon in 1928 and 1930 in the Victorian Football League (now the AFL).

Arthur played thirty games and kicked fifty-four goals for Essendon, debuting against Geelong in round 4, 1928 and playing his final game against Collingwood in round 18, 1930.  Originally from the Sandhurst Football Club, he returned there after leaving Essendon, before playing and coaching at Golden Square and Dimboola.  He then moved to South Australia to coach Norwood in the South Australian National Football League for two years.

He was the father of Graham Arthur who captained and coached the Hawthorn Football Club.

References

External links

1905 births
1979 deaths
Essendon Football Club players
Norwood Football Club coaches
Sandhurst Football Club players
Golden Square Football Club players
Dimboola Football Club players
Australian rules footballers from Bendigo